The St. Lawrence Avenue station is a local station on the IRT Pelham Line of the New York City Subway. The station, served by the 6 train at all times, is located at the intersection of St. Lawrence Avenue and Westchester Avenue in the Parkchester neighborhood of the Bronx.

History 
St. Lawrence Avenue station opened on May 30, 1920 as the Pelham Line was extended to East 177th Street from Hunts Point Avenue. The construction of the Pelham Line was part of the Dual Contracts, signed on March 19, 1913 and also known as the Dual Subway System. The Pelham Line was built as a branch of the Lexington Avenue Line running northeast via 138th Street, Southern Boulevard and Westchester Avenue. Initially, the extension was served by a shuttle service operating with elevated cars. Passengers transferred to the shuttle at Hunts Point Avenue.

Station layout

The station has three tracks and two side platforms. The center express track is used by the  service during weekdays in the peak direction.

The station resembles other elevated stations along the line: it has a wood mezzanine and no windscreens along the platform edges. St. Lawrence Avenue is the northernmost station on the IRT Pelham Line that does not serve rush-hour express service.

Exits
There is a mezzanine below the east end of the station, which contains the station's only exit. Outside fare control, exit stairs lead to the southwest and northeast corners of Westchester Avenue and St. Lawrence Avenue.

References

External links 

 
 Station Reporter — 6 Train
 The Subway Nut — St. Lawrence Avenue Pictures
 St. Lawrence Avenue entrance from Google Maps Street View
 Platforms from Google Maps Street View (Daytime)
 Platforms from Google Maps Street View (Night)

IRT Pelham Line stations
New York City Subway stations in the Bronx
Railway stations in the United States opened in 1920
1920 establishments in New York City